WDXO (92.9 FM) is a radio station broadcasting a classic hits format. Licensed to Hazlehurst, Mississippi, United States, the station is currently owned by Telesouth Communications.

On May 1, 2008 WDXO changed their format from oldies to sports, branded as "The Ticket".

On June 1, 2018 WDXO changed formats from sports to adult hits, branded as "92.9 Jack FM".

References

External links

Jack FM stations
Adult hits radio stations in the United States
DXO